The Columns are the most recognized landmark of the University of Missouri in Columbia, Missouri. Along with Jesse Hall, they are one of the most photographed sites in Missouri. The Columns have been at the center of many traditions and events including graduations, concerts, pranks, weddings, and protests. Mizzou's school song mentions the columns, and they have been the setting for a work of fiction. They are a contributing structure to the Francis Quadrangle National Historic District. The columns underwent preservation work in 2017.

History
Academic Hall was constructed in 1840–1843 as the first building of the University of Missouri and the first public university building west of the Mississippi River. Accountant and architect Stephen Hills, who also designed the first Missouri State Capitol Building, designed the hall. The hall's columns were made from limestone drums from the Hinkson Creek Valley south of the campus.
When Academic Hall burned to the ground in 1892, the columns remained standing. In the next few months after the fire, many people thought that the Columns were an eyesore that blocked the view of the new buildings (Red Campus) being constructed on the Quadrangle. Some even worried that they were structurally unsound and a safety hazard. In August 1893, the Board of Curators issued a resolution that called for the Columns to be demolished "as soon as convenient". A local newspaper reported that Gideon F. Rothwell had ordered two mule teams to pull down and remove the Columns. Jerry S. Dorsey, a leading Columbia citizen, led a protest against their removal, saying that "the Columns could not be pulled down by a herd of elephants". Rothwell replied that the columns were coming down "even if he had to dynamite them." Dorsey obtained a judicial writ that halted the immediate destruction of the Columns, and an architect said they would be structurally sound. The protest from Columbia citizens and the reassurance that the Columns did not pose a safety hazard led Rothwell and the other curators to have a change of heart in December 1893, and the Columns remain.
In 2017, the columns underwent a major preservation effort. In the 2017 fall semester, the University of Missouri offered a class called "The Geology of the Columns".

Traditions
At the beginning of the academic year, freshmen participate in Tiger Walk to symbolize their move from the wider community to the university by walking through the columns. Tap Day occurs under the columns, when the schools secret societies announce their new members.

Appearances in art and literature
A mural of James S. Rollins and the Columns is located in the office of the Missouri Governor in the Missouri State Capitol.  They are also featured in a monumental stained-glass window titled Missouri at Peace located in the Missouri House Chamber.

A mural by George Caleb Bingham depicting Academic Hall was destroyed when the same burned. Academic Hall and the Columns are also featured in murals in the Boone County Courthouse and the Columbia Municipal Court.

The Columns are the namesake of Penny Garrison's novel In The Shadow of the Columns.

Gallery

References

University of Missouri campus
Burned buildings and structures in the United States
University and college academic buildings in the United States
Buildings and structures completed in 1843
National Register of Historic Places in Boone County, Missouri
University and college buildings on the National Register of Historic Places in Missouri
1843 establishments in Missouri
1840s architecture in the United States
Greek Revival architecture in Missouri
Neoclassical architecture in Missouri
Historic district contributing properties in Missouri
Landmarks in Columbia, Missouri